The Suha Mare is a right tributary of the river Moldova in Romania. It discharges into the Moldova near Mălini.

References

Rivers of Romania
Rivers of Suceava County